{{DISPLAYTITLE:C21H25NO}}
The molecular formula C21H25NO (molar mass: 307.429 g/mol) may refer to:

 Benzatropine, or benzotropine
 Hepzidine
 2β-Propanoyl-3β-(2-naphthyl)-tropane (or WF-23)

Molecular formulas